The Dujiangyan railway station is a railway station of Chengdu–Dujiangyan Intercity Railway. The station located in Guankou, Dujiangyan, Chengdu, Sichuan, China.

Destinations and Prices

Rolling Stock
China Railways CRH1A

See also
Chengdu–Dujiangyan High-Speed Railway

References

Stations on the Chengdu–Dujiangyan Intercity Railway
Railway stations in Sichuan
Railway stations in China opened in 2010